Robert Joseph Coombes (born 27 April 1972) is an English musician and keyboard player for Supergrass.

He is the older brother of the band's lead singer, Gaz Coombes, and the most recent member to join Supergrass, officially joining in 2002, though he had been an unofficial member for the majority of the band's career to that point. He has played keyboards on all of the band's albums and tours as well as helping with the writing and arranging. 

He favours the Hammond Organ, for which his playing has been described as “the perfect foil to Gaz’s guitar bombast”. He lives in Oxford with his three children, Louis, Lila and Ailla. He has a second, younger, brother, Charly, who was keyboard player in the band 22–20s.

In 2022, Rob joined the supergroup Wingmen which features members of The Stranglers, Johnny Moped, The Damned (band) and Ruts DC. They played their first gig at the Colchester Arts Centre on 18 January 2023, with more UK dates to follow and their debut self-titled album is set for release on 27 January 2023.

References

External links

1972 births
Living people
Britpop musicians
English expatriates in the United States
English keyboardists
Music in Oxford
musicians from Oxford
Supergrass members